Marije is a given name. Notable people with this name include:

 Marije van Hunenstijn (born 1995), Dutch sprinter
 Marije Joling (born 1987), Dutch female allround speed skater
 Marije Tolman (born 1976), Dutch illustrator of children's literature
 Marije Vogelzang, Dutch food designer

Dutch feminine given names